Emila Medková, née Emila Tláskalová (19 November 1928 – 19 September 1985) was a Czech photographer, one of the important exponents of the Czech art photography in the second half of the 20th century. Her work was influenced by Surrealism. She was the wife of painter Mikuláš Medek.

Biography 
Medková was born in Ústí nad Orlicí. Her father was a typographer and her mother was a seamstress. The family moved to Prague, where, in 1942, Emila began to attend the class of the landscape photographer Josef Ehm at a specialized photography school in the Smíchov district of Prague.

Her work has been directly linked to Surrealism. In the early period, she joined a circle of young artists centered around Karel Teige. From 1947 to 1951, she and Mikuláš Medek created collections of staged photographs. She married him on 12 September 1951. From the early 1950s, she focused on creating several loosely overlapping thematic cycles that went through her whole career, up to her death. At the turn of the 1950s and 1960s, she became a leading exponent of the Czech Informel photography. Although she found inspiration mainly in Prague, she created extensive photographic cycles of Paris (1966) and Italy (1967). The life and work of Medková were covered in a monograph designed by art historians Karel Srp and Lenka Bydžovská, curators of her first comprehensive exhibition, held in 2001.

Medková gave only one interview in her life. It was initiated by the renowned art historian Anna Fárová and published in 1976 in the magazine Československá fotografie (Czechoslovak Photography).

After the death of her husband (Medek died in 1974), she suffered a stroke and was partially paralyzed. She died in Prague.

"Czechoslovak Photography From 1915 to the 1960s" 
From 10 June to 31 August 1992 the Jacques Baruch Gallery in Chicago showed an exhibit called "Czechoslovak Photography From 1915 to the 1960s.” It showed 90 images by 16 photographers with a range of renown and obscurity. Emila Medkova is significant in that she was the only female entry in this male-dominated show.

Solo exhibitions 

1960 Výstavka fotografií Emilie Medkové z let 59 a 60, Krajský vlastivědný ústav v budově muzea, Hradec Králové
1962 Galerie Krzywe kolo, Warsaw, Poland
1963 Photographs 1951-1963, Hluboká nad Vltavou Castle, Hluboká nad Vltavou
1963 Emila Medková. Photographs, Oblastní galerie, Liberec
1963 Emila Medková - photographs 1951-1963, Vlastivědné muzeum, Písek
1963 Emilia Medková. Abstractions?, Miami Museum of Modern Art, Miami, USA
1963 Výstava umělecké fotografie E. Medkové, Dům osvěty ve stálé výstavní síni v budově Městské knihovny, Kralupy nad Vltavou
1964 Dům pánů z Kunštátu, Brno
1965 Emila Medková, Divadlo Jednotného závodního klubu ROH, Ústí nad Orlicí
1965 Emila Medková. Fotografie z let 1949-1964., Galerie mladých, Alšova síň, Prague
1966 Emila Medková. Photographs., Miami Museum of Modern Art, Miami, USA
1970 Mikuláš Medek. Emila Medková., Galerie am Klosterstern, Hamburg, Germany
1978 Emila Medková, Minigalerie VÚVL (Výzkumný ústav veterinárních léčiv), Brno-Medlánky
1979 Dům pánů z Kunštátu, Brno
1980 Emila Medková. Photographs., Výstavní síň, Česká Třebová
1984 Galerie Jindřicha Štreita, Sovinec
1985 Fotochema, Prague
1987 Emila Medková. Photographs., Obvodné kultúrne a spoločenské stredisko Bratislava II, Spoločenský dom Trnávka, Bratislava
1988 Galerie Jindřicha Štreita, Sovinec
1990 Emila Medková. Začátek a konec iluzí., Galerie V předsálí, KS Blansko
1995 Pražský dům fotografie, Prague
1997 Emila Medková: Surrealistische Fotografie., Tschechisches Zentrum, Berlin, Germany
1997 Emila Medková: Surrealistische Fotografie., LiteraturWerkstatt, Berlin, Germany
2000 Z pozůstalosti, Pražský dům fotografie, Prague
2000 Galerie Franze Kafky, Prague
2001 Ateliér Josefa Sudka, Prague
2001 Dům U kamenného zvonu, Prague
2003 Emila Medková, Dům fotografie, Český Krumlov
2004 Emila Medková - Surreale Sujets der tschechischen Fotografin, Museum Bad Arolsen - Schloss, Germany
2004 Stadtmuseum Hofheim am Taunus, Germany
2004 Galerie der Stadt Tuttlingen, Tuttlingen, Germany
2005 Emila Medková - fotografické dílo, Galerie pod radnicí, Ústí nad Orlicí

Selected bibliography

References

Further reading 
 Angels of Anarchy: Women artists and surrealism by Patricia Allmer with Roger Cardinal, 2009.

External links 

Emila Medková - exhibitions, literature etc. (Society for Contemporary Arts)

Photographers from Prague
1928 births
1985 deaths
Czech women photographers
20th-century Czech women artists
People from Ústí nad Orlicí
Surrealist artists
Czech surrealist artists
Women surrealist artists
20th-century women photographers